Barbara Scott Young, Baroness Young of Old Scone,  (born 8 April 1948) is a Scottish Labour member of the House of Lords. She was created a life peer on 4 November 1997 as Baroness Young of Old Scone, of Old Scone in Perth and Kinross.

Baroness Young is currently chair of the Woodland Trust. She joined the Trust's Board in January 2016 and became chair on 9 June 2016.

She was the Chief Executive of health charity Diabetes UK, a position she took up on 1 November 2010 till September 2015.

Before joining Diabetes UK, Young was involved in the establishment of the Care Quality Commission (CQC). Then Health Secretary Alan Johnson announced the appointment of Baroness Young as chair of the organisation on 15 April 2008. The announcement followed an independent recruitment exercise conducted by the Appointments Commission and a pre-appointment scrutiny hearing. by the Health Select Committee, which subsequently endorsed Young for appointment as the CQC chair. She held this position until 1 February 2010.

Prior to taking up the post of chair of the CQC, Young was the chief executive of the Environment Agency (2000 – May 2008), an appointment which led to her becoming a non-affiliated member in the House of Lords; previously she had taken the Labour whip. Other posts she has held include chair of English Nature; vice chairman of the BBC; board member of AWG plc; Chief Executive of the Royal Society for the Protection of Birds and of a number of local health authorities, including Parkside Health Authority.

In 2010, Young was appointed Chancellor of Cranfield University and was elected an Honorary Fellow of the Royal Society of Edinburgh in 2017.

References

1948 births
Living people
BBC Governors
Life peeresses created by Elizabeth II
Labour Party (UK) life peers
People associated with Cranfield University
Fellows of the Royal Scottish Geographical Society